Ali Cengiz (born April 8, 1996) is a Turkish wrestler competing in the 87 kg division of Greco-Roman wrestling. He won one of the bronze medals in the 87kg event at the 2022 World Wrestling Championships held in Belgrade, Serbia. He is a member of the Ankara Aski Sport Club.

Career 
Ali Cengiz won a bronze medal at the 2019 FILA U-23 European Wrestling Championship held in Serbia, Novi Sad.

In 2022, he won one of the bronze medals in his event at the Vehbi Emre & Hamit Kaplan Tournament held in Istanbul, Turkey. He won one of the bronze medals in the 87 kg event at the 2022 Mediterranean Games held in Oran, Algeria.

Achievements

References

External links 
 

Living people
1996 births
Turkish male sport wrestlers
European Wrestling Championships medalists
World Wrestling Championships medalists
Islamic Solidarity Games competitors for Turkey
Islamic Solidarity Games medalists in wrestling
Competitors at the 2022 Mediterranean Games
Mediterranean Games bronze medalists for Turkey
Mediterranean Games medalists in wrestling
21st-century Turkish people